Kunzea axillaris is a flowering plant in the myrtle family, Myrtaceae and is endemic to a small area of New South Wales. It is an erect shrub or tree with linear leaves and white flowers which are arranged singly in leaf axils. It is only known from the ranges on the north coast.

Description
The leaves taper towards the petiole and have a pointed end.

Taxonomy and naming
Kunzea axillaris was first formally described in 2016 by Hellmut R. Toelken and the description was published in Journal of the Adelaide Botanic Garden. The specific epithet (axillaris) is a Latin word meaning "of an axil" referring to the flowers which appear singly in the leaf axils.

Distribution and habitat
This kunzea grows in wet sclerophyll forest on the ranges between Taree and Kempsey.

References

axillaris
Flora of New South Wales
Myrtales of Australia
Plants described in 2016
Taxa named by Hellmut R. Toelken